Jawahar Navodaya Vidyalaya, Pailapool is one of the approximately 565 Jawahar Navodaya Vidyalayas in India. The school is located in Pailapool near Cachar, Assam about 27 kilometres from Silchar. JNV Pailapool is affiliated to CBSE. Jawahar Navodaya Vidyalayas are schools for talented children generally from poor families. They form a part of the system of gifted education. The objectives of the scheme are to provide education to talented children predominantly from the rural areas, irrespective of their family's socio-economic condition.

As much as 80% of the seats are reserved for candidates from the rural areas of the district.

References

External links
Navodaya Vidyalaya Samiti
Schools of hope – Business Today Article

Jawahar Navodaya Vidyalayas in Assam
Schools in Assam
Cachar district
1994 establishments in Assam
Educational institutions established in 1994